Santiam is a place name of the U.S. state of Oregon, referring to the indigenous Santiam people. It may refer to:

 Santiam Academy
 Santiam Hospital
 Santiam Junction, Oregon
 Santiam Junction State Airport
 Santiam Pass
 Santiam River
 Santiam State Forest